The Ireland A national rugby league team nicknamed the Wolfhounds is made up of amateur players from the Irish domestic competition. The team competed against England A, Wales A and Scotland A in the Amateur Four Nations and against the USA in a St Patrick's Day match. The team is administered by Rugby League Ireland. Carl De Chenu is the current coach.

Squad 

The following squad was picked for the 2015 match against Belgium

Overall Record

Results

See also 
 Ireland national rugby league team match results
 List of Ireland national rugby league team players
 Amateur Four Nations

References 

 
 A results

Rugby league in Ireland
Ireland national rugby league team
Amateur rugby league
Irish rugby league lists
National rugby league second teams